"Be a Light" is a song recorded by American country music singer Thomas Rhett and featuring guest vocals from Reba McEntire, Hillary Scott, Chris Tomlin, and Keith Urban. It was released on March 30, 2020. To date, this is McEntire's most recent top-10 hit.

Rhett performed the song live at the 54th Annual Country Music Association Awards alongside McEntire and Tomlin for the first time.

Content and history
Rhett said that he wrote the song in 2019, but chose to release it because he thought its message would be well received in the wake of the COVID-19 pandemic. He told Billboard that the song "was really just about being a light in a dark place; being an encouragement to people." He co-wrote the song with Matt Dragstrem, Josh Thompson, and Josh Miller. The song was sent to country radio on March 30, 2020. On April 5, 2020, he performed it on ACM Presents: Our Country, a television special put on by the Academy of Country Music. Rhett also announced that proceeds from the song will be donated to the MusiCares COVID-19 Relief Fund.

Chart performance
Be a Light entered the US Billboard Hot 100 at number 71 on the chart dated for the week ending April 18, 2020. In doing so, it became the first entries on that chart for both Scott and Tomlin (though the former has charted repeatedly with Lady A). With a peak of number 2 on the Billboard Country Airplay chart, it became Rhett's first single to miss the top spot since "Vacation" peaked at number 30 in 2016.

Personnel
Credits by AllMusic

David Angell - violin
Monisa Angell - viola
Jenny Bufano - violin
Zeneba Bowers - violin
Janet Darnall - violin
David Davidson - violin
Matt Dragstrem - programming
Conni Ellisor - violin
Alicia Engstrom - violin
Dann Huff - electric guitar, piano, programming
Charlie Judge - keyboards, piano
Chris Kimmerer - drums
Anthony LaMarchina - cello
Betsy Lamb - viola
Tony Lucido - bass guitar
Reba McEntire - featured vocals
Carole Rabinowitz-Nueun - cello
Justin Niebank - programming
Sari Reist - cello
Thomas Rhett - lead vocals
Hillary Scott - featured vocals
Chris Tomlin - featured vocals
Ilya Toshinsky - acoustic guitar
Keith Urban - electric guitar, featured vocals
Mary Kathryn Van Osdale - violin
Derek Wells - electric guitar
Kris Wilkinson - viola, string arrangements

Charts

Weekly charts

Year-end charts

Certifications

References

2020 songs
2020 singles
Country ballads
2020s ballads
Thomas Rhett songs
Hillary Scott songs
Keith Urban songs
Reba McEntire songs
Songs written by Thomas Rhett
Songs written by Matt Dragstrem
Songs written by Josh Thompson (singer)
Song recordings produced by Dann Huff
Big Machine Records singles
Chris Tomlin songs
Songs about the COVID-19 pandemic
Vocal collaborations